was a Japanese novelist, playwright, poet, artist, and philosopher active during the late Taishō and Shōwa periods of Japan. Later on in life he requested that the pronunciation of his surname (as far as was concerned) be changed from the usual Mushanokōji, to Mushakōji, but without much success. He was nicknamed Musha and Futo-o by his colleagues.

Early life
Born in Kōjimachi, Chiyoda, Tokyo Saneatsu was the eighth son of Viscount Mushanokōji Saneyo, who died when Saneatsu was age two. Raised mostly by his mother. Saneatsu was a frail and sickly youth, unable to compete in the physical activities at the Gakushūin Peers' School.  To compensate, he developed his debating skills and developed an interest in literature. During his time at this school he became friends with Naoya Shiga, and was introduced by his uncle to the Bible and the works of Tolstoy. Saneatsu enrolled in the sociology department of Tokyo Imperial University, but left without graduating in 1907 to form a literary group with Kinoshita Rigen, Shiga Naoya, Arishima Takeo, and Ogimachi Kinkazu (:ja:正親町公和). They named the group Jūyokkakai (The Fourteenth Day Club). This group evolved into the Shirakaba (White Birch) literary coterie, and began publishing a literary magazine of the same name in 1910. In 1913, Saneatsu married Fusako Miyagi, a woman to whom he had earlier been introduced by Kokichi Otake. Both Miyagi and Otake were members of the women's literary association (and publishers of the journal of the same name), "Bluestocking".

Literary career
As a key member of Shirakaba, Mushanokōji in 1910 published his work  in its magazine, Shirakaba. Through the medium of Shirakaba, Mushanokōji began moving away from the Tolstoy ideal of self-sacrifice, and promoted his philosophy of humanism as an alternative to then-popular form of naturalism. While his humanism borrowed some elements from naturalism, he in general believed that humanity controlled its own destiny through the assertion of will, whereas the naturalists tended to see the individual as powerless and desperate against forces beyond personal control.

With the outbreak of World War I, Mushanokōji turned again to Tolstoy for inspiration and for the further development of his humanitarianism philosophy. During this time, he published  (1915), a play involving a choice between self-love and love for mankind. He relocated to what is now part of Abiko, Chiba in 1916, together with Shiga Naoya and Yanagi Sōetsu.

In 1918, Mushanokōji took the next step in the development of his philosophy by moving to the mountains of Kijō, Miyazaki in Kyūshū, and establishing a quasi-socialistic utopian commune, Atarashiki-mura (New Village) along vaguely Tolstoyan lines. His idealism appears in his autobiographical novel  (1923), and in the play  (1922). 
The commune also published its own literary magazine, Atarashiki-mura. In the 1920s, while running the commune, Mushanokōji was very prolific in his literary output. However, Mushanokōji tired of the social experiment and left the village in 1926; a dam project forced it to relocate to Saitama Prefecture in 1939, where it still exists.

After the Great Kantō earthquake of 1923, Mushanokōji returned to Tokyo to run an art gallery, and started to sell his own paintings, mostly still lifes depicting pumpkins and other vegetables. Publication of Shirakaba was suspended after the earthquake, but Mushanokōji went on to bring out the literary magazine, Fuji, with the novelist and playwright Nagayo Yoshirō. During this period, he turned his attention to writing historical novels or biographical novels, such as Ninomiya Sontoku, about the 19th century farm technologist and agricultural philosopher.

Through the 1930s and 1940s, he faded from the literary world. Encouraged by his older brother Kintomo Mushanokōji, who was the Japanese ambassador to Nazi Germany, he traveled throughout Europe in 1936. In 1946, he was appointed to a seat in the House of Peers of the Diet of Japan. However, four months later he was purged from public office by the American Occupation authorities, due to his  (1942), supporting the actions of the Japanese government in World War II.

Mushanokōji made a literary comeback with his novel  (1949–1950). He was awarded the Order of Culture in 1951, and became a member of the Japan Art Academy in 1952.

Mushanokōji lived to the age of 90. He died at the Jikei University School of Medicine Hospital in Komae, Tokyo of uremia. His grave is at the Chūō Reien in the city of Hachiōji, close to Tokyo. His home in Chōfu, Tokyo, where he lived from 1955 to 1976 has been turned into a memorial museum.

Ancestry

See also

Japanese literature
List of Japanese authors

References

 Mortimer, Maya. Meeting the Sensei: The Role of the Master in Shirakaba Writers. Brill Academic Publishers (2000). 
 Watanabe, Kanji. Mushanokoji Saneatsu (Jinbutsu shoshi taikei). Kinokuniya Shoten (1984).  (Japanese)

External links

Japanese Literature home page
English guide to Memorial Hall & Saneatsu Park
Memorial Hall 
Saneatsu Mushanokoji's grave
National Diet Library home page
Yuichi Mori:apprentice
 
 

1885 births
1976 deaths
People from Chiyoda, Tokyo
20th-century Japanese novelists
Japanese male short story writers
Shirakaba-ha
Members of the House of Peers (Japan)
Recipients of the Order of Culture
Tolstoyans
20th-century Japanese painters
20th-century Japanese poets
20th-century Japanese dramatists and playwrights
19th-century Japanese short story writers
University of Tokyo alumni
20th-century Japanese philosophers